Moskvina is a rural locality (a village) in Verkh-Invenskoye Rural Settlement, Kudymkarsky District, Perm Krai, Russia. The population was 215 as of 2010. There are 9 streets.

Geography 
Moskvina is located 39 km west of Kudymkar (the district's administrative centre) by road. Yarasheva is the nearest rural locality.

References 

Rural localities in Kudymkarsky District